Thomas Hagelskjær (born 4 February 1995) is a Danish professional footballer who plays for Aarhus Fremad as a goalkeeper.

Career
His loan deal at Aarhus Fremad was made permanent in summer 2021.

References

1995 births
Living people
Danish men's footballers
Aarhus Gymnastikforening players
Vejle Boldklub players
Aarhus Fremad players
Danish 1st Division players
Danish 2nd Division players
Danish Superliga players
Association football goalkeepers
Footballers from Copenhagen